Scolopendrellidae is a family of symphylans in the class Symphyla. There are about 7 genera and at least 30 described species in Scolopendrellidae. In this family, the first pair of legs is reduced in size and is never more than half as long as the next pair. In some species, the first pair is only rudimentary or vestigial. In the genus Symphylella, for example, the first leg pair is reduced to small protuberances. A species of the extant genus Symphylella is known from the mid Cretaceous (Cenomanian) aged Burmese amber of Myanmar.

Gener
 Geophilella
 Pseudoscutigerella
 Scolopendrella
 Scolopendrellina
 Scolopendrellopsis
 Symphylella
 Symphylellopsis

References

Further reading

 
 
 

Myriapod families
Myriapods